Hussein Mohamed Mohamoud, also known as Hussein Hog, is a Somali politician. He is the former Minister of Health of Somaliland, from July 2010 to June 2013.

See also

 Politics of Somaliland
 Ministry of Health (Somaliland)
 Cabinet of Somaliland

References

Living people
Government ministers of Somaliland
Health ministers of Somaliland
Somaliland politicians
Year of birth missing (living people)